HPSE may refer to:
 Heparanase, an enzyme
 Blood group B branched chain alpha-1,3-galactosidase, an enzyme